Bernabé Melendrez, aka "El Gatillero" (born April 12, 1949) is a Mexican action film actor and, after his directorial debut in 2012, film director. He is also a singer.

Career
Melendrez has participated in a number of Mexican movies.

Many of the films he has participated on have been denominated as "narco-peliculas" (Narco-films) because of recurrent stories about drug trafficking.

Filmography
El Hijo del Hijo Desobediente ("The Son of the Disobedient Son"), 2014 - actor
Polleros del Sur ("Southern Poulterer"), 2012 - director 
El Charro Juarez ("Charro Juarez"), 2007 - actor 
Indio Quiere Llorar 2 ("The Indian Wants to Cry 2"), 2006 - actor 
El Rey De Los Galleros (loosely translated to "King of the Rooster-Fighters"), 2006 - actor 
Corrido de Juan Martha ("Juan Martha's Corrido"), 2006 - actor 
Los Tres Centenarios, 2005 - actor
El Cara De Chango 2 ("Monkey Face 2"), 2005 - actor 
Sin Pelos en La Lengua ("Without Mincing Words"), 2005 - actor 
Regalo Caro II ("Expensive Present II"), 2004 - actor 
Narcos y Perros 2 ("Dogs and Drug Dealers 2"), 2003 - actor 
Los Abogados del Diablo ("The Devil's Lawyers"), 2003 - actor
Los Hijos De Gavino Barrera ("Gavino Barrera's Children"), 2003 - actor 
La Lobo y el Gatillero ("Female Wolf and the Gunman"), 2003 - actor 
Los Hijos del Gallero ("The Cockfighting Fan's Sons"), 2003 - actor 
El Cara de Chango ("Monkey Face") - actor 
La Hija De La Hiena ("The Hyena's Daughter") - actor 
Regalo Caro ("Expensive Present"), 2002 - actor 
El Jefe De La Mafia ("Mafia Boss"), 2002 - actor 
Las Tres Tumbas Parte 2 ("The Three Tombs, Part 2"), 2002 - actor
El Rey De La Mota, 2001 - actor
Los Dos Federales ("The Two Feds"), 2000 - actor 
Misa De Cuerpo Presente ("Funeral Service with a Body"), 1993 - actor 
Muerte En Tijuana ("Death in Tijuana") - actor

References

1949 births
20th-century Mexican male actors
Male actors from Zacatecas
People from Nochistlán
Living people
21st-century Mexican male actors
Mexican male film actors
Mexican male singers